Unionville, Maryland may refer to:
Unionville, Frederick County, Maryland, an unincorporated community in Frederick County
Unionville, Talbot County, Maryland, an unincorporated community in Talbot County
Unionville, Worcester County, Maryland, an unincorporated community in Worcester County